Baghgah (also Romanized as Bāghgāh; also known as Bagha) is a village in Pasakuh Rural District, Zavin District, Kalat County, Razavi Khorasan Province in Iran. At the 2006 census, its population was 174.

See also 

 List of cities, towns and villages in Razavi Khorasan Province

References 

Populated places in Kalat County